Plešivica is a small village west of Povir in the Municipality of Sežana in the Littoral region of Slovenia.

References

External links
Plešivica on Geopedia

Populated places in the Municipality of Sežana